The Fujita–Storm equation is a nonlinear partial differential equation. It occurs  frequently in problems of nonlinear heat and mass transfer, combustion theory and theory of flows in porous media

References

 Graham W. Griffiths William E.Shiesser Traveling Wave Analysis of Partial Differential p135 Equations Academy Press
 Richard H. Enns George C. McCGuire, Nonlinear Physics Birkhauser,1997
 Inna Shingareva, Carlos Lizárraga-Celaya, Solving Nonlinear Partial Differential Equations with Maple Springer.
 Eryk Infeld and George Rowlands,Nonlinear Waves, Solitons and Chaos, Cambridge 2000
 Saber Elaydi, An Introduction to Difference Equationns, Springer 2000
 Dongming Wang, Elimination Practice,Imperial College Press 2004
 David Betounes, Partial Differential Equations for Computational Science: With Maple and Vector Analysis Springer, 1998 
 George Articolo Partial Differential Equations & Boundary Value Problems with Maple V Academic Press 1998 

Nonlinear partial differential equations